Recklinghausen may refer to:
Recklinghausen (city), a city in Germany
Recklinghausen (district), a district in Germany
Neurofibromatosis type I, also known as Von Recklinghausen syndrome
Heinrich von Recklinghausen (1867-1942), a German physiologist
Friedrich Daniel von Recklinghausen, a German pathologist